Simizhi Sundaram Iyer (Tamil: சுந்தரம் ஐயர்) (1884–1927) was a Carnatic music composer.

Profile 
Simizhi is a small village near Kudavasal, in Nannilam taluk of Tanjavur district. Sundaram Iyer was born in 1884 as one among four brothers and a sister. He is supposed to have started singing when he was 5–6 years of age. When he was about 8–10 years old, he learnt under Maha Vaidyanatha Sivan's elder brother, Ramaswamy Sivan at Tiruvaiyaru. Sundaram Iyer married his own uncle's daughter (Meenakshi) and had two daughters.

He taught Carnatic music to many. Tiruvarur Rajayi learnt from him. Tirukottaram Saminatha Mudaliar and Kavalakudi Mudaliar also patronised him.

Later, he moved to Mayavaram (now Mayiladuthurai) to teach a few people. He decided to stay permanently in Mayavaram and taught people like Mayavaram Rajam, Mayavaram Krishna Iyer, Flute Rajaramayyar (guru of S. G. Kittappa) and others. Violinist Mayavaram Govindaraja Pillai is also supposed to have learnt from him. Mudicondan Venkatarama Iyer used to visit him in Tiruvarur and later Mayavaram, frequently, stay with him for a couple of days, and learn music.

See also 
 Tyagaraja
 Viswanatha Sastri

External links 
 Music Academy's Souvenir (See Page 7 Entry #209)
 Nuances of Mudikondan neraval from The Hindu
 The Master from Mudicondan from The Hindu

1884 births
1927 deaths
Carnatic composers
People from Tiruvarur district
20th-century Indian musicians